The Battle of West Henan–North Hubei was one of the 22 major engagements between the National Revolutionary Army and Imperial Japanese Army during the Second Sino-Japanese War. It was fought in March–May 1945 in northern Hubei and western Henan. While it was a tactical stalemate, the battle was an operational victory for the Japanese forces, who seized control of local airbases, denying Chinese forces any localized air support.

Order of battle

Sources 

 Hsu Long-hsuen and Chang Ming-kai, History of The Sino-Japanese War (1937-1945) 2nd Ed., 1971. Translated by Wen Ha-hsiung, Chung Wu Publishing; 33, 140th Lane, Tung-hwa Street, Taipei, Taiwan Republic of China. Pg. 452–57. Map 43.  
  抗日战争时期的侵华日军序列沿革 (Order of battle of the Japanese army that invaded China during the Sino Japanese War)

Conflicts in 1945
West Henan-North Hubei 1945
West Henan-North Hubei, Battle of
1945 in China
1945 in Japan
Military history of Henan
Military history of Hubei
March 1945 events in Asia
April 1945 events
May 1945 events in Asia

fr:Bataille d'Henan-Hubei